The Singapore Flyer is an observation wheel at the Downtown Core district of Singapore. Officially opened on 15 April 2008, it has 28 air-conditioned capsules, each able to accommodate 28 passengers, and incorporates a three-story terminal building. The flyer has made numerous appearances in media and popular culture that features Singapore.

Early history
The Singapore Flyer was first conceived in the early 2000s by Patrick MacMahon of Melchers Project Management, a subsidiary of German company Melchers. Formal planning commenced in 2002. A new company, Singapore Flyer Pte Ltd, was formed as the developer, with Melchers Project Management holding a 75% stake, and the remainder held by Orient & Pacific Management.

The project was formally announced and endorsed on 27 June 2003 by the Singapore Tourism Board with the signing of a memorandum of understanding, formalising the understanding between the developer and tourism board with regard to the land-acquisition process.

Under this agreement, the tourism board was to purchase the plot of land in Marina Centre from the Singapore Land Authority, and lease it to Singapore Flyer Pte Ltd for 30 years with an option to extend the lease by another 15 years. The land was to be rent-free during the construction phase of the project. In July 2003, Jones Lang LaSalle was appointed as the real estate advisor. Takenaka and Mitsubishi were selected as the main contractors, and Arup as the structural engineer.

In August 2007, Florian Bollen, Singapore Flyer Pte Ltd chairman, raised his stake in the Singapore Flyer from 60% to 90% through acquisition of Melchers Project Management's 30% stake. The deal was done via AAA Equity Holdings, a private investment vehicle headed by Bollen. Orient & Pacific Management, which spearheaded the project development management, owns the remaining 10%.

Construction
The groundbreaking ceremony was held on 27 September 2005, with Mah Bow Tan, then Minister for National Development, as guest of honour. The spindle was fitted on 13 December 2006, and the outer rim was completed on 9 April 2009. Installation of the passenger capsules began on 3 August 2007 and was completed on 2 October 2007.

Opening
The Flyer opened in 2008. During Chinese New Year, corporate 'inaugural flights' were held from 11 to 13 February, and tickets for which sold out for S$8,888, an auspicious number in Eastern culture. The first public rides were on Valentine's Day, 14 February, the soft launch on 1 March, and the official opening on 15 April, at which Prime Minister Lee Hsien Loong was the guest of honour.

Design

Designed by Arup and Mitsubishi Heavy Industries with a capacity of up to 7.3 million passengers a year, the normally constant rotation of the wheel means that a complete trip lasts approximately 32 minutes.

The Flyer's 28 air-conditioned capsules are mounted outboard of the rim of the wheel structure, providing continuously unobstructed views.

The wheel initially rotated in a counter-clockwise direction when viewed from Marina Centre, but on 4 August 2008 this was reversed on the advice of Feng shui masters.

Wheelchair ramps and lifts, handicapped toilets and a dedicated parking lot for the disabled are also provided.

Acquisition
On 28 August 2014, Straco Leisure Pte. Ltd. announced the acquisition of Singapore Flyer after embezzlement and financial issues with the now defunct predecessor company, Great Wheel Corporation. Straco Leisure Pte. Ltd. is 90% owned by Straco Corporation Limited, a Singaporean listed company that operates tourist attractions in China such as the Shanghai Ocean Aquarium and Underwater World Xiamen. The remaining 10% is owned by WTS Leisure Pte. Ltd., one of the largest private tour bus operators in Singapore.

In media
The Bloomberg Television series High Flyers is filmed in one of the Flyer's capsules.
The Flyer makes an appearance in the 2018 film, Crazy Rich Asians, based on the novel of the same name by Kevin Kwan.
The Flyer was featured in a task on the sixteenth season of the American reality show The Amazing Race as well as during the finale of the first season of the Australian variant ''The Amazing Race Australia.
The Flyer was featured and visited by South Korean band Twice for their TWICE TV series (TWICE TV6) when they were in Singapore.
The Flyer was featured in two Detective Conan films, once in the 2016 film The Darkest Nightmare, and another time in the 2019 film The Fist of Blue Sapphire.
The Flyer will appear in HBO series Euphoria, as part of the third season.

Gallery

Notes and references

Notes

References

External links

 Official website

Ferris wheels
Amusement rides introduced in 2008
Entertainment venues in Singapore
Downtown Core (Singapore)
Marina Centre
Tourist attractions in Singapore